Prairie Township may refer to:

Arkansas
 Prairie Township, Arkansas County, Arkansas, in Arkansas County, Arkansas
 Prairie Township, Ashley County, Arkansas, in Ashley County, Arkansas
 Prairie Township, Boone County, Arkansas
 Prairie Township, Carroll County, Arkansas
 Prairie Township, Craighead County, Arkansas, in Craighead County, Arkansas
 Prairie Township, Franklin County, Arkansas, in Franklin County, Arkansas
 Prairie Township, Hot Spring County, Arkansas, in Hot Spring County, Arkansas
 Prairie Township, Johnson County, Arkansas, in Johnson County, Arkansas
 Prairie Township, Lonoke County, Arkansas, in Lonoke County, Arkansas
 Prairie Township, Madison County, Arkansas
 Prairie Township, Newton County, Arkansas, in Newton County, Arkansas
 Prairie Township, St. Francis County, Arkansas, in St. Francis County, Arkansas
 Prairie Township, Searcy County, Arkansas
 Prairie Township, Sebastian County, Arkansas, in Sebastian County, Arkansas
 Prairie Township, Washington County, Arkansas
 Prairie Township, Yell County, Arkansas, in Yell County, Arkansas

Illinois
 Prairie Township, Crawford County, Illinois
 Prairie Township, Edgar County, Illinois
 Prairie Township, Hancock County, Illinois
 Prairie Township, Shelby County, Illinois

Indiana
 Prairie Township, Henry County, Indiana
 Prairie Township, Kosciusko County, Indiana
 Prairie Township, LaPorte County, Indiana
 Prairie Township, Tipton County, Indiana
 Prairie Township, Warren County, Indiana
 Prairie Township, White County, Indiana

Iowa
 Prairie Township, Davis County, Iowa
 Prairie Township, Delaware County, Iowa
 Prairie Township, Fremont County, Iowa
 Prairie Township, Keokuk County, Iowa
 Prairie Township, Kossuth County, Iowa
 Prairie Township, Mahaska County, Iowa

Kansas
 Prairie Township, Jewell County, Kansas
 Prairie Township, Wilson County, Kansas

Missouri
 Prairie Township, Audrain County, Missouri
 Prairie Township, Bates County, Missouri
 Prairie Township, Carroll County, Missouri
 Prairie Township, Franklin County, Missouri
 Prairie Township, Howard County, Missouri
 Prairie Township, Jackson County, Missouri
 Prairie Township, Lincoln County, Missouri
 Prairie Township, McDonald County, Missouri
 Prairie Township, Montgomery County, Missouri
 Prairie Township, Pettis County, Missouri
 Prairie Township, Randolph County, Missouri
 Prairie Township, Schuyler County, Missouri

Nebraska
 Prairie Township, Phelps County, Nebraska

North Dakota
 Prairie Township, LaMoure County, North Dakota, in LaMoure County, North Dakota

Ohio
 Prairie Township, Franklin County, Ohio
 Prairie Township, Holmes County, Ohio

South Dakota
 Prairie Township, Union County, South Dakota, in Union County, South Dakota

Township name disambiguation pages